Adomas is a Lithuanian language given name, the Lithuanized form of the name  Adam. Notable people known under this name include:

Pranas Končius (code name Adomas; died 1965), last anti-Soviet Lithuanian partisan killed in action
Icikas Meskupas (pseudonym Adomas; 1907–1942), leader of the Lithuanian Komsomol and Communist Party in interwar Lithuania
Adomas Drungilas (born 1990), Lithuanian professional basketball player
Adomas Galdikas (1893–1969), Lithuanian painter, graphic artist, and scenographer
Adomas Varnas (1879–1979), Lithuanian painter, photographer, collector, philanthropist, and educator

Lithuanian masculine given names